Mount Si High School is a high school located in the Snoqualmie Valley in Snoqualmie, Washington and is a part of the Snoqualmie Valley School District.

History
According to the Seattle Times, Mount Si High School was founded as early as 1944, during World War II. The war affected the school, as six students died fighting in this war; then principal Miller B Stewart, who was also their Boy Scout scoutmaster said, "They were all good boys." Students in the school were praised for working to raise money for the war effort. Later graduates also served as leaders in the military in the 1990s. The Mount Si High School class of 1966 built a memorial for their classmates killed in action.

In the 1940s, Mount Si High School had between fifty-five and sixty-five students graduate every year.

In 1952, the Snoqualmie School District allocated money to construct a new building for Mount Si High School.

Mount Si High School completed the building of a new campus, started in 2015 and opening on September 7, 2019. The new campus has seven buildings, some three stories, with greenhouses on top. It now houses up to 2,300 students, has a 400-car garage, and includes many security features (including few entry points and a secure check procedure before visitors are allowed in). Several food spaces exist, with some run by students in training. The new gym has two levels and bleachers for up to 2,400 people. As the school is on a flood plain, the school is "raised off of the ground on a platform above the 100-year flood level" and on 4,800 stone columns beneath the surface to stabilize the soil; this provides additional space for parking below the building. Some aspects of the school were completed later, including the baseball/softball fields in February 2020 and the new Performing Arts Center (PAC) in January 2021. A parking/bus loop area was completed in April 2021.

School awards 
Mount Si High School has received honors for overall and academic achievement: 
 appearing on US News & World Report's “Best High Schools” list. The magazine awarded a Silver Medal to the school in 2013, 2014, 2015, 2016, and 2018, based on reading, math and college readiness data. Mount Si was ranked 18 out of over 500 high schools in Washington state, and 1,243 of more than 20,500 high schools in the United States in 2018.
 being on Newsweek's 2016 America’s Top 500 High Schools list 
 being rated 17 out of the top 50 best high schools in Washington State

Studies of school 
Research on Mount Si High School has been conducted by education scholars since the 1960s, including research on its "innovative uses of social media," "identification of employability skills," teaching of American history, and teaching of journalism.

Controversies 
In 2008, Mount Si High School was involved in a controversy over a visit by Reverend Ken Hutcherson, who was invited to speak about his experience growing up with racism. Some called into question his dedication to equality for all people in light of his opposition to same-sex relationships. Hutcherson then used money from his nonprofit "to fight against a $56 million bond measure that would have helped repair Mount Si High School's decaying floors, installed wheelchair accessible ramps in the school's portables, and fixed other buildings in the district (while also paying for construction of a new middle school)."

In November, 2009, a freshman attending Mount Si High School was attacked by another student in a locker room after defending another student against anti-gay slurs.

References

External links
Washington State Report Card

High schools in King County, Washington
Public high schools in Washington (state)